Out of It is a 1969 American comedy-drama film directed by Paul Williams, and starring Barry Gordon, Jon Voight, Lada Edmund Jr., Gretchen Corbett, and Peter Grad. It was entered into the 20th Berlin International Film Festival.

Cast
 Barry Gordon as Paul
 Jon Voight as Russ
 Lada Edmund Jr. as Christine
 Gretchen Corbett as Barbara
 Peter Grad as Steve
 Martin Gray as Draft Board
 Oliver Berry
 Leonard Gelber as Draft Board

Production
The film was made before Voight's breakout performance in Midnight Cowboy but released after.

References

External links

1969 films
1969 directorial debut films
1969 comedy films
1969 drama films
1960s coming-of-age comedy-drama films
American black-and-white films
American coming-of-age comedy-drama films
Films directed by Paul Williams
Films set in Long Island
Films scored by Michael Small
United Artists films
1960s teen films
1960s teen comedy-drama films
1960s English-language films
1960s American films